Peruvian Air Line S.A. was a Peruvian airline based in Lima. The airline offered primarily domestic flights out of its main base at Jorge Chávez International Airport. On October 2, 2019, the airline ceased all operations due to liquidity issues.

History
Peruvian Airlines was founded in November 2007, receiving its air operator's certificate from Peru's aviation authority on August 7, 2008. The airline commenced operations on October 29, 2009.

In July 2018, at Farnborough Airshow, Peruvian Airlines made public plans to create a subsidiary named Aero Perù that was to commence operations in 2020.

The airline ceased operations on October 2, 2019, due to the Peruvian Customs Tax Court seizing the airline's bank accounts after the airline failed to complete fuel payments.

Destinations

Peruvian Airlines served the following destinations (as of July 2018):

Codeshare agreements
Peruvian maintained codeshare agreements with the following airlines:
Aerolíneas Argentinas 
Copa Airlines
Star Perú

Fleet

Final fleet
As of September 2019, Peruvian Airlines active fleet consisted of the following aircraft:

Retired fleet
Peruvian Airlines previously operated the following aircraft:

Accidents and incidents
On March 20, 2016, Peruvian Airlines Flight 218, operated by a Boeing 737-500 (registration OB-2041-P) rejected takeoff when an engine ingested a bird. A problem with the braking system resulted in a burst tire and the plane veered off the runway. No injuries were reported with a 120 passengers and crew on board.
On March 28, 2017, Peruvian Airlines Flight 112, operated by a Boeing 737-300 (registration OB-2036-P) swerved off the runway while landing at Francisco Carle Airport and subsequently caught fire. All 141 onboard survived the accident.
On November 23, 2018, Peruvian Airlines Flight 331, operated by a Boeing 737-500 (registration OB-2041-P), suffered the collapse of its landing gear as it attempted to land at El Alto International Airport in La Paz, Bolivia. The plane was arriving from Cusco with 122 passengers and five crew members on board. No injuries were reported.

See also
List of defunct airlines of Peru

References

External links

Peruvian Airlines

Defunct airlines of Peru
Airlines established in 2007
Airlines disestablished in 2019
Peruvian brands